Poverty is an unincorporated community located in McLean County, Kentucky, United States. Poverty was named by William Short, a local physician who strongly disliked his snobbish neighbors. The neighbors had formed a society called "the Social Circle" whose membership conferred a perceived high social status. Poverty was meant to be an insult.

Poverty has been noted for its unusual place name.

References

Unincorporated communities in McLean County, Kentucky
Unincorporated communities in Kentucky